Leesten is a small village located in Bavaria, Germany. It is in Oberfranken (Upper Franconia), in the Bamberg district. Leesten is a constituent community of Strullendorf.

In 2009, Leesten had a total population of 260.

Geography
Leesten has an elevation of about 300 meters.

History
The origin of the name "Leesten" is from the Slavic word Liescina, which means hazel bushes.

Culture
An organization for fishermen in the Strullendorf community, named the "Anglerverein Strullendorf e.V.", is based in Leesten.

Infrastructure
Leesten lies on the Staatsstraßen 2188 and 2210.

References

External links
 Official Site of Leesten 
 History of Leesten (on the Strullendorf site), Accessed September 20, 2010 
 Anglerverein Strullendorf e.V. 

Villages in Bavaria
Bamberg (district)
Strullendorf